This is a list of the National Register of Historic Places listings in DeWitt County, Texas.

This is intended to be a complete list of properties and districts listed on the National Register of Historic Places in DeWitt County, Texas. There are five districts and 55 individual properties listed on the National Register in the county. Ten individually listed properties are Recorded Texas Historic Landmarks including one that is also a State Antiquities Landmark. Two districts contain several more Recorded Texas Historic Landmarks.

Current listings

The publicly disclosed locations of National Register properties and districts may be seen in a mapping service provided.

|}

See also

National Register of Historic Places listings in Texas
Recorded Texas Historic Landmarks in DeWitt County

References

External links

Registered Historic Places
Dewitt County
Buildings and structures in DeWitt County, Texas